Malik Nawab Sher Waseer WAS (born 26 July 1945) in Chack No 633 GB Riaz NAGAR is a Pakistani politician who has been a member of the National Assembly of Pakistan since August 2018. Previously he was a member of the National Assembly from 2008 to 2013.

Political career
He was elected to the National Assembly of Pakistan from Constituency NA-76 (Faisalabad-II) as a candidate of Pakistan Peoples Party (PPP) in 2008 Pakistani general election. He received 43,294 votes and defeated Zahid Nazir, a candidate of Pakistan Muslim League (Q) (PML-Q).

He ran for the seat of the National Assembly from Constituency NA-76 (Faisalabad-II) as a candidate of PPP in 2013 Pakistani general election but was unsuccessful. He received 35,750 votes and lost the seat to Muhammad Tallal Chaudry. In the same election, he ran for the seat of the Provincial Assembly of the Punjab as an independent candidate from Constituency PP-53 (Faisalabad-III) but was unsuccessful. He received 174 votes and lost the seat to Iffat Miraj Awan.

He was re-elected to the National Assembly as a candidate of Pakistan Tehreek-e-Insaf (PTI) from Constituency NA-102 (Faisalabad-II) in 2018 Pakistani general election. He did not follow the party line in his vote on the no confidence motion against Imran Khan in March 2022.

Electoral history

2018

References

Living people
Pakistani MNAs 2008–2013
Pakistani MNAs 2018–2023
Pakistan People's Party MNAs
Pakistan Tehreek-e-Insaf MNAs
1945 births